The 2020 NCAA Division I men's basketball tournament was a planned single-elimination tournament of 68 teams to determine the National Collegiate Athletic Association (NCAA) Division I men's college basketball national champion for the 2019–20 season. The 82nd edition of the tournament would have begun on March 17, 2020, and concluded with the championship game on April 6 at Mercedes-Benz Stadium in Atlanta, Georgia.

On March 12, the tournament, as well as all other NCAA championships for the remainder of the academic year, were cancelled due to the COVID-19 pandemic in the United States, just five days before it was set to begin. It was the first time the tournament had been cancelled since its creation in 1939.

COVID-19 impact and cancellation 

The timing of the tournament coincided with the wider spread of the COVID-19 pandemic in the United States. On March 10, the Ivy League announced it had cancelled the conference's tournament, and would award its championship and automatic qualification to Yale based on regular season records. Harvard University was scheduled to host the event at Lavietes Pavilion in Boston on March 14 and 15. Some conferences subsequently announced they would go on with their tournaments while holding their games behind closed doors with no outside spectators and limited attendance, especially on March 11 (when the World Health Organization declared COVID-19 a pandemic).

The NCAA subsequently announced it would go on with its winter-sport championships, including its basketball tournaments, with attendance limited to essential staff and family members. Some venues (such as those in Ohio and California) enacted further local numerical restrictions on the numbers of those who could attend an event, which the NCAA agreed to respect. Reports also stated that for practicality reasons, the NCAA was considering re-locating some of the later rounds (including the regional finals and the Final Four, the latter scheduled to be held at the 71,000-seat Mercedes-Benz Stadium) to smaller venues within the same host cities.

On March 11, hours after the WHO's pandemic declaration, the NBA suspended its regular season after Utah Jazz player Rudy Gobert was diagnosed with COVID-19. On the same night, Nebraska coach Fred Hoiberg fell visibly ill during a game in the first round of the Big Ten tournament. There were initial fears that Hoiberg had COVID-19, but he was ultimately diagnosed with influenza A. The following day, due in part to Gobert's diagnosis and Hoiberg’s health scare, all conferences that had not yet concluded tournament play announced they would be scrapping their tournaments. Many of them had announced they would play without fans, but it was decided to scrap play altogether. With the decision to cancel the 2020 Mid-Eastern Athletic Conference tournament, all games that had yet to be played in the basketball season were cancelled, while the Big East called off its tournament at halftime during a quarter-final game between Creighton and St. John's. Most major conferences also announced suspensions of all athletics to varying degrees. Later in the day, the NCAA announced the tournament would be cancelled, along with all remaining winter and spring championships for the academic year.

The NCAA had not ruled out publishing what would have been its at-large selections and bracket. Vice president of men's basketball Dan Gavitt told the Associated Press that he had proposed holding a shortened, 16-team tournament in Atlanta (split between State Farm Arena and Mercedes-Benz Stadium) as an alternative, with all participants chosen by the selection committee, before the decision was made to cancel the entire tournament due to Rudy Gobert's diagnosis. The NCAA ultimately decided against releasing any brackets, with Gavitt stating, "Brackets based on hypotheticals can’t substitute for a complete selection, seeding and bracketing process."

As part of a cycle that began in 2016, TBS was scheduled to televise the 2020 Final Four and national championship game. CBS was scheduled to televise the selection show. CBS Sports and Turner Sports announced on March 16 that all technicians and utility staff who were expected to work the NCAA March Madness coverage would still be paid. Radio rightsholder Westwood One announced plans to offer encores of radio broadcasts from classic NCAA tournament games—accompanied by interviews with notable figures from the respective games—to fill the time slots it had originally devoted to the tournament. CBS similarly announced on March 19 that it would also air nine classic Final Four games across the weekend afternoons of March 21, 22, and 29.

Originally scheduled dates, venues, and television coverage

Prior to cancellation, fourteen venues had been scheduled to host games in the 2020 tournament:

First Four
March 17 and 18
University of Dayton Arena, Dayton, Ohio (Host: University of Dayton)

First and Second Rounds
March 19 and 21
 Times Union Center, Albany, New York (Host: Metro Atlantic Athletic Conference/Siena College)
 Spokane Arena, Spokane, Washington (Host: University of Idaho)
 Enterprise Center, St. Louis, Missouri (Host: Missouri Valley Conference)
 Amalie Arena, Tampa, Florida (Host: University of South Florida)
March 20 and 22
 Greensboro Coliseum Complex, Greensboro, North Carolina (Host: Atlantic Coast Conference)
 CHI Health Center Omaha, Omaha, Nebraska (Host: Creighton University)
 Golden 1 Center, Sacramento, California (Host: Sacramento State University)
 Rocket Mortgage FieldHouse, Cleveland, Ohio (Host: Mid-American Conference/Cleveland State University)

Regional semifinals and finals (Sweet Sixteen and Elite Eight)
March 26 and 28
Midwest Regional, Lucas Oil Stadium, Indianapolis, Indiana (Host: Horizon League/IUPUI)
West Regional, Staples Center, Los Angeles, California (Host: Pepperdine University)
March 27 and 29
South Regional, Toyota Center, Houston, Texas (Host: University of Houston)
East Regional, Madison Square Garden, New York, New York (Host: St. John's University/Big East Conference)

National semifinals and championship (Final Four and championship)
April 4 and 6
Mercedes-Benz Stadium, Atlanta, Georgia (Host: Georgia Institute of Technology)

Automatic qualifiers
Twelve teams had automatically qualified for the 2020 NCAA field by virtue of winning their conference's tournament.

All conference tournaments that had not been completed were cancelled, the majority without naming an automatic qualifier. Teams with † next to their names were named automatic qualifiers by their conferences after their tournament was cancelled.

See also
 Impact of the COVID-19 pandemic on sports
 2004–05 NHL lockout
 1994 World Series
 2020 NCAA Division I women's basketball tournament
 2020 NCAA Division II men's basketball tournament
 2020 NCAA Division III men's basketball tournament
 2020 NAIA Division I men's basketball tournament
 2020 National Invitation Tournament

References

Ncaa tournament
NCAA Division I men's basketball tournament
NCAA Division I men's basketball tournament
Basketball in Georgia (U.S. state)
College sports in Georgia (U.S. state)
2020 in Atlanta
NCAA tournament